White Hot is the fourth album by the rock band Angel. After the release of On Earth as It Is in Heaven, bass guitar player Mickie Jones left and was replaced by Felix Robinson.

The album contains Angel's only top 50 hit, "Ain't Gonna Eat Out My Heart Anymore," originally recorded by The Young Rascals in 1965, which went to #44 on the Billboard Hot 100 in 1978. The single spent eight weeks on the Billboard Hot 100. The album peaked at #55 on the [[Billboard Top 200|Billboard Top 200]].

 Cover Art 
The cathedral in the background is directly inspired by Notre Dame de Paris. Cover concept by David Joseph & Chris Whorf according to inner sleeve credits.

Critical receptionThe New Rolling Stone Record Guide'' gave the album 0 stars, a rating reserved for "worthless" records.

Track listing
"Don't Leave Me Lonely" (Barry Brandt, Frank DiMino) – 4:00
"Ain't Gonna Eat Out My Heart Anymore" (Lori Burton, Pam Sawyer) – 2:50
"Hold Me, Squeeze Me" (Frank DiMino, Gregg Giuffria, Punky Meadows) – 3:49
"Over and Over" (Frank DiMino, Gregg Giuffria, Punky Meadows) – 3:01
"Under Suspicion" (Barry Brandt, Frank DiMino, Gregg Giuffria, Punky Meadows) – 4:42 
"Got Love If You Want It" (Frank DiMino, Gregg Giuffria, Punky Meadows) – 4:28
"Stick Like Glue" (Frank DiMino, Gregg Giuffria, Punky Meadows) – 2:38
"Flying with Broken Wings (Without You)" (Frank DiMino, Gregg Giuffria, Punky Meadows) – 3:32
"You Could Lose Me" (Frank DiMino, Gregg Giuffria, Punky Meadows) – 4:53
"The Winter Song" (Frank DiMino, Gregg Giuffria, Punky Meadows) – 3:44

Singles

Personnel
Frank DiMino - lead and backing vocals
Punky Meadows - electric and acoustic guitars
Gregg Giuffria - keyboards, Moog, IIIC synthesizer
Felix Robinson - bass, backing vocals, six-string bass
Barry Brandt - drums, backing vocals, percussion, electronic drums

References

1978 albums
Angel (band) albums
Casablanca Records albums